Xiangyuan County is a county in the southeast of Shanxi province, China. It is under the administration of the prefecture-level city of Changzhi. It is between 112 ° 42 ′ - 113 ° 14 ′ E and 36 ° 23 ′ - 36 ° 44 ′ n with a total area of 1178 square kilometers.

Climate

References

Weblinks
www.xzqh.org 

 
County-level divisions of Shanxi
Changzhi